Harry Larrison Jr. (May 28, 1926 – May 29, 2005) was an American Republican Party politician, who served on the Monmouth County Board of Chosen Freeholders from February 12, 1966 to December 2, 2004. The nearly 39 years that Larrison served marked the longest tenure of a Freeholder in New Jersey history.

Biography
Freeholder Larrison was born in Neptune Township to Harry Larrison Sr. and Dorothy Brown Larrison; he attended local schools, graduating from Neptune High School in 1945. In 1946 he joined the Ocean Grove Fire Department, where he would later serve as chief. In 1956 he was appointed to the Neptune Township Housing Authority and in 1960 Larrison was appointed to a vacancy on the Neptune Township Committee.

On February 12, 1966, Larrison was appointed to a vacancy on the Board of Chosen Freeholders caused by the resignation of Charles I. Smith; in November of that year he was elected to the first of 13 consecutive three-year terms. He would continuously serve as a freeholder until December 2, 2004, when he resigned due to failing health.

Freeholder Larrison served as director in 1977–1978, from 1981 to 1983, and again from 1986 to 2004.

On April 27, 2005, Larrison was charged by federal prosecutors with accepting $8,500 in bribes to help developers gain approval for their projects, but died before the case was heard.

Larrison died at age 79 of cancer on May 29, 2005 at Jersey Shore University Medical Center.

See also
List of Monmouth County Freeholder Directors

References

1926 births
2005 deaths
County commissioners in New Jersey
New Jersey Republicans
Neptune High School alumni
People from Neptune Township, New Jersey
Deaths from cancer in New Jersey
20th-century American politicians